David Aslin (born July 26, 1989) is a Swedish professional ice hockey forward. He is currently an unrestricted free agent who most recently played with Södertälje SK of the HockeyAllsvenskan (Allsv).

Aslin made his Swedish Hockey League debut playing with Växjö Lakers during the 2012–13 SHL season.

Aslin is currently playing for Ringerike Panthers in Norway

References

External links

1989 births
Living people
Leksands IF players
People from Mora Municipality
Rögle BK players
Södertälje SK players
Swedish ice hockey forwards
IF Troja/Ljungby players
Växjö Lakers players
Sportspeople from Dalarna County